documenta 5 was the fifth edition of documenta, a quinquennial contemporary art exhibition. It was held between 30 June and 8 October 1972 in Kassel, West Germany. The artistic director was Harald Szeemann. The title of the exhibition was: Befragung der Realität – Bildwelten heute / Questioning Reality – Pictorial worlds today.

Szeemann's curation is known for establishing a model for future art biennial events, with a central, thematic curatorial idea.

Participants

References 

Documenta
1972 in Germany
1972 in art